The 2014 Women's World Ice Hockey Championships was the 16th such event hosted by the International Ice Hockey Federation (IIHF). This was the first time that the women's tournaments were played in an Olympic year. The IIHF determined that the best way to continue advancing the competitive level of nations not invited to the Olympic tournament was to fund participation every year. No top level tournament was played, and initially the IIHF stated that the last placed Olympic participant would be relegated to be replaced by the Division I Group A winner. However after discussion it was changed so that the two teams in question played best of three series instead of simply swapping places.

2014 Winter Olympics

Top Division Playoff
The last-placed team of the Olympics faced the winner of this year's Division I A tournament in a best-of-three series. The winner was promoted to the 2015 Top Division. The games took place on 8–11 November 2014 in Yokohama, Japan.

All times are local (Japan Standard Time – UTC+9)

Division I

Division I Group A
The Division I Group A tournament was played in Přerov, Czech Republic, from 6 to 12 April 2014.

Division I Group B
The Division I Group B tournament was played in Ventspils, Latvia, from 6 to 12 April 2014.

Division II

Division II Group A
The Division II Group A tournament was played in Asiago, Italy, from 6 to 12 April 2014.

Division II Group B
The Division II Group B tournament was played in Reykjavík, Iceland, from 24 to 30 March 2014.

Division II Group B Qualification
The Division II Group B Qualification tournament was played in Mexico City, Mexico, from 19 to 22 March 2014.

References

External links
 Official website of IIHF

 
2014
World